The Indy Richmond 300 (formally known as the SunTrust Indy Challenge) is an IndyCar Series race held at Richmond Raceway near Richmond, Virginia from 2001 to 2009,. From 2001–2007, the race was scheduled for 250 laps (187.5 miles); from 2008 to 2009, the race distance was extended to 300 laps.

The event debuted as a Saturday night race in 2001. The event became one of the more popular races on the schedule, and was arguably the most successful IndyCar race held in traditional "NASCAR Country". The race hearkened back to the classic short track "bull ring" style of racing known for during the AAA and USAC eras of Indy car racing.

ISC traditionally paired the race with other open-wheeled racing. The NASCAR Whelen Modified Tour once accompanied the race, but in later years USAC open-wheel short track racing had been on the undercard.

AAA held two National Championship sprint car races at the track when it was still a half-mile dirt track under the name Strawberry Hill Speedway. Later, NASCAR sanctioned two Championship Car events at nearby Martinsville Speedway in 1952 and 1953.

On July 30, 2009, RIR track President Doug Fritz announced that the SunTrust Indy Challenge would not be on the 2010 IndyCar Series schedule. The costs to put on the event and possible loss of sponsorship was cited as the reason for the IRL and RIR to not come to an agreement on the event.

On August 28, 2019, it was announced that the IndyCar Series would be returning to Richmond in 2020, replacing the ABC Supply 500 at Pocono Raceway. However, due to schedule changes brought upon by the COVID-19 pandemic and "local restrictions", IndyCar announced on May 21 that the race had been canceled.

Past winners

2003: Race shortened due to rain.

Support race winners

References

External links
IndyCar.com race page
champcarstats.com

SunTrust Indy Challenge
Recurring sporting events disestablished in 2009
Recurring sporting events established in 2020